The 1950 Texas Longhorns football team represented the University of Texas in the 1950 college football season.

For the September 30th game against Purdue, Texas chose to wear their White uniforms at home, this would be the last time they would wear white at home for 70 years until October 24, 2020.

Schedule

Awards and honors
Bud McFadin, Guard, Cotton Bowl Classic Co-Most Valuable Player
Bud McFadin, Consensus All-American

References

Texas
Texas Longhorns football seasons
Southwest Conference football champion seasons
Texas Longhorns football